Events from the year 1933 in the United States.

Incumbents

Federal Government 
 President: Herbert Hoover (R-California) (until March 4), Franklin D. Roosevelt (D-New York) (starting March 4)
 Vice President: Charles Curtis (R-Kansas) (until March 4), John Nance Garner (D-Texas) (starting March 4)
 Chief Justice: Charles Evans Hughes (New York)
 Speaker of the House of Representatives: John Nance Garner (D-Texas) (until March 4), Henry Thomas Rainey (D-Illinois) (starting March 9)
 Senate Majority Leader: James Eli Watson (R-Indiana) (until March 4), Joseph Taylor Robinson (D-Arkansas) (starting March 4)
 Congress: 72nd (until March 4), 73rd (starting March 4)

Events

January–March

 January 5 
Construction of the Golden Gate Bridge begins in San Francisco Bay.
Calvin Coolidge, 30th President of the U.S (1923–1929) dies of coronary thrombosis in Northampton, Massachusetts.
 January 17 – The U.S. Congress votes favorably for Philippines independence, against the view of President Herbert Hoover.
 January 23 – The Twentieth Amendment to the United States Constitution is ratified, changing Inauguration Day from March 4 to January 20.
 January 30 – The Lone Ranger debuts on American radio.
 February 6 – The Twentieth Amendment to the United States Constitution goes into effect.
 February 6–7 – Officers on the USS Ramapo record a 34-meter high sea-wave in the Pacific Ocean.
 February 10 – The New York City-based Postal Telegraph Company introduces the first singing telegram.
 February 15 – In Miami, Florida, Giuseppe Zangara attempts to assassinate President-elect Franklin D. Roosevelt, but instead fatally wounds Chicago Mayor Anton J. Cermak.
 February 17 
 Newsweek magazine is published for the first time.
 The Blaine Act ends Prohibition in the United States.
 February 25 – , the first ship of the United States Navy designed as an aircraft carrier, is launched at Newport News, Virginia.
 March 2 – The original film version of King Kong, starring Fay Wray, premieres at Radio City Music Hall and the RKO Roxy Theatre in New York City.
 March 3 – Mount Rushmore National Memorial is dedicated.
 March 4 
Franklin D. Roosevelt is sworn in as the 32nd President of the United States, who in reference to the Great Depression, proclaims "The only thing we have to fear, is fear itself" in his inauguration speech. He is sworn in by Chief Justice Charles Evans Hughes, beginning the first 100 days of Franklin D. Roosevelt's presidency. Roosevelt's paralytic illness is never publicly acknowledged during what will be the four terms of his Presidency. This is the last time Inauguration Day in the U.S. occurs on this date. John Nance Garner is sworn in as Vice President of the United States.
Frances Perkins becomes United States Secretary of Labor, and the first female member of the United States Cabinet.
 March 5 – Great Depression: President Franklin D. Roosevelt declares a "bank holiday", closing all United States banks and freezing all financial transactions (the 'holiday' ends on March 13).
 March 6 – Mayor Anton Cermak of Chicago dies of the wound he received on February 15.
 March 9 – Great Depression: The U.S. Congress begins its first 100 days of enacting New Deal legislation.
 March 10 – The 6.4  Long Beach earthquake affects the Greater Los Angeles Area with a maximum Mercalli intensity of VIII (Severe), leaving 115–120 people dead, and causing an estimated $40 million in damage.
 March 12 – Great Depression: Franklin D. Roosevelt addresses the nation for the first time as President of the United States, in the first of his "Fireside Chats".
 March 15 – The Dow Jones Industrial Average rises from 53.84 to 62.10.  The day's gain of 15.34%, achieved during the depths of the Great Depression, remains to date as the largest 1-day percentage gain for the index.

April–June
 
 April – Civilian Conservation Corps established.
 April 4 – The U.S. airship Akron crashes off the coast of New Jersey, leaving 73 dead.
 April 5 
U.S. President Franklin D. Roosevelt declares a national emergency and issues Executive Order 6102, making it illegal for U.S. citizens to own gold.
Emergency Conservation Work founded.
 April 7 – Sale of some beer is legalized in the U.S. under the Cullen-Harrison Act of March 22, 8 months before the full repeal of Prohibition in December.
 April 15 – The Indiana State Police begins operations.
 April 19 – The United States officially goes off the gold standard.
 April 26 – Editors of the Harvard Lampoon steal the Sacred Cod of Massachusetts from the State House (it is returned two days later).
 May 3 – Nellie Tayloe Ross becomes the first woman to be named director of the United States Mint.
 May 5 – The detection by Karl Jansky of radio waves from the center of the Milky Way Galaxy is reported in The New York Times. The discovery leads to the birth of radio astronomy.
 May 12 – Agricultural Adjustment Act is enacted in the U.S.
 May 18 – New Deal: President Franklin D. Roosevelt signs an act creating the Tennessee Valley Authority.
 May 27 
New Deal: The Federal Securities Act is signed into law, requiring the registration of securities with the Federal Trade Commission. 
The Century of Progress World's Fair opens in Chicago.
Walt Disney's classic Silly Symphony cartoon The Three Little Pigs is first released.
 June 5 – The U.S. Congress abrogates the United States' use of the gold standard by enacting a joint resolution (48 Stat. 112) nullifying the right of creditors to demand payment in gold.
 June 6 – The first drive-in theater opens in Camden, New Jersey.
 June 15 – National Guard Bureau founded.
 June 17 – Union Station Massacre: In Kansas City, Missouri, Pretty Boy Floyd kills four unarmed FBI agents and accidentally kills fugitive Frank Nash in an attempt to free Nash.
 June 26 – The American Totalisator Company unveils its first electronic pari-mutuel betting machine at the Arlington Park Racetrack near Chicago.

July–September
 July 1 – Business Plot: Smedley Butler becomes involved in a secret coup attempt led by Gerald MacGuire against President of the United States Franklin Delano Roosevelt which fails (according to his own testimony in 1934).
 July 6 – The first Major League Baseball All-Star Game is played at Comiskey Park in Chicago.
 July 22 – "Machine-Gun" Kelly and Albert Bates kidnap Charles Urschel, an Oklahoma oilman, and demand $200,000 ransom.
 July 24
 Several members of the Barrow Gang are injured or captured during a running battle with local police near Dexter, Iowa.
 In one of his radio Fireside chats, "On the Purposes and Foundations of the Recovery Program", President Roosevelt introduces the term "first 100 days".
 August 1 – The Blue Eagle emblem of the National Recovery Administration is displayed publicly for the first time.
 August 10 
Division of Investigation founded.
Shipping Board Bureau and Emergency Fleet Corporation founded.
 August 14 – Loggers cause a forest fire in the Coast Range of Oregon, later known as the first forest fire of the Tillamook Burn. It is extinguished on September 5, after destroying 240,000 acres (971 km2).
September 18 – Tennessee Valley Authority is established.

October–December
  
 October 7 - The New York Giants (baseball) defeat the Washington Senators, 4 games to 1, to win their 4th World Series title.
 October 10 – A United Airlines Boeing 247 is destroyed near Chesterton, Indiana, by a bomb. This is the first proven case of air sabotage in commercial airline history.
 October 12 – The United States Army Disciplinary Barracks on Alcatraz is acquired by the United States Department of Justice, which plans to incorporate the island into its Federal Bureau of Prisons as a federal penitentiary.
 October 17 – Albert Einstein arrives in the United States as a refugee from Nazi Germany.
 November 8 – New Deal: U.S. President Franklin D. Roosevelt unveils the Civil Works Administration, an organization designed to create jobs for more than 4 million of the unemployed.
 November 11 – Dust Bowl: In South Dakota, a very strong dust storm strips topsoil from desiccated farmlands (one of a series of disastrous dust storms this year).
 November 13 – Jasper McLevy becomes mayor of Bridgeport, Connecticut, the first Socialist mayor in New England; he serves until 1957.
 November 16 – The United States and the Soviet Union establish formal diplomatic relations.
 November 17 – The Marx Brothers' anarchic comedy film Duck Soup is released in the U.S.
 December 5 – The 21st Amendment to the United States Constitution, repealing Prohibition, goes into effect.
 December 6 – U.S. federal judge John M. Woolsey rules that James Joyce's novel Ulysses is not obscene.

Undated

 President Roosevelt rejects socialism and government ownership of industry.
 The first doughnut store under the Krispy Kreme name opens on Charlotte Pike in Nashville, Tennessee.
 15 million unemployed in the U.S.

Ongoing
 Lochner era (c. 1897–c. 1937)
 U.S. occupation of Haiti (1915–1934)
 Prohibition (1920–1933)
 Great Depression (1929–1933)
 Dust Bowl (1930–1936)
 New Deal (1933–1939)

Births

January

 January 1 – Ford Konno, American swimmer
 January 2
 Dan Duncan, businessman, oil company executive and billionaire (d. 2010)
 Richard Riley, American soldier, lawyer, and politician, 6th United States Secretary of Education
 January 5 – Leonard Marsh, American businessman, co-founder of Snapple (d. 2013)
 January 6
 Lenny Green, American baseball player (d. 2019)
 January 7 
 Phil Mulkey, decathlete and coach
 Fred L. Turner, American businessman and philanthropist (d. 2013)
 January 8 
 Charles Osgood, American journalist, commentator 
 Nolan Miller, American fashion and jewelry designer (d. 2012)
 Willie Tasby, American baseball player
 January 9 – Robert García, American politician (d. 2017)
 January 13 – Tom Gola, American basketball player (d. 2014)
 January 14 – Stan Brakhage, American filmmaker (d. 2003)
 January 15 – Ernest J. Gaines, American author (d. 2019)
 January 16 – Susan Sontag, American author (d. 2004)
 January 17 – Shari Lewis, American ventriloquist (d. 1998)
 January 20 – Ronald Townson, American singer (d. 2001)
 January 22 – Lennie Rosenbluth, American basketball player (d. 2022)
 January 23 – Chita Rivera, American actress and dancer
 January 24 – Bob Beattie, American skiing coach (d. 2018)
 January 27 – Tony Windis, American basketball player 
 January 29 – Paul Sally, American mathematician and academic (d. 2013)
 January 30 – Swede Halbrook, American basketball player (d. 1988)

February

 February 1 – Wendell R. Anderson, American politician (d. 2016)
 February 2 – M'el Dowd, American actress and singer (d. 2012)
 February 3 – Paul Sarbanes, American politician (d. 2020)
 February 4 – Shirley Burkovich, American baseball player (d. 2022)
 February 6 – Walter E. Fauntroy, African-American civil rights activist
 February 10 – Billy O'Dell, American baseball player (d. 2018)
 February 13
 Kim Novak, American actress
 Peter L. Pond, American clergyman and philanthropist (d. 2000)
 February 17
 Larry Jennings, American magician and author (d. 1997)
 Bobby Lewis, American R&B singer
 Craig L. Thomas, American captain and politician (d. 2007 in the United States)
 February 21 
 Bob Rafelson, American film director, producer and screenwriter (d. 2022)
 Nina Simone, African-American singer (d. 2003)
 February 23 – Donna J. Stone, poet and philanthropist (d. 1994)
 February 26 – Godfrey Cambridge, actor and comedian (d. 1976)
 February 27 – Raymond Berry, American football player
 February 28 – Charles Vinci, weightlifter (d. 2018)

March

 March 3 – Lee Radziwill, American socialite (d. 2019)
 March 5 – Marlene Riding In Mameah, American silversmith (d. 2018)
 March 6 – Ted Abernathy, American baseball player (d. 2004)
 March 9 – Lloyd Price, African-American R&B singer (d. 2021)
 March 12
 Myrna Fahey, American actress (d. 1973)
 Barbara Feldon, American actress, model (Get Smart) 
 March 13
 Mike Stoller, American songwriter (d. 2011)
 Gloria McMillan, American former actress, teacher (d. 2022)
 Donald Henry Gaskins, American serial killer (d. 1991)
 March 14 
 Jake Godbold, American politician (d. 2020)
 Quincy Jones, African-American music producer and composer
 March 15 – Ruth Bader Ginsburg, Associate Justice of the Supreme Court of the United States from 1993 (d. 2020)
 March 16 – Sanford I. Weill, American financier and philanthropist
 March 18
 Unita Blackwell, African-American civil rights activist (d. 2019)
 Win Wilfong, American basketball player (d. 1985)
 March 19 – Philip Roth, American novelist (d. 2018)
 March 23 
 Hayes Alan Jenkins, figure skater
 Philip Zimbardo, psychologist, professor emeritus at Stanford University
 March 24 – William Smith, actor (d. 2021)  
 March 25 – Dick Duckett, basketball player 
 March 28 – Frank Murkowski, politician
 March 29 – Bob Schafer, basketball player (d. 2005)
 March 30 – Joe Ruby, animator (d. 2020)
 March 31 – Anita Carter, singer (d. 1999)

April

 April 1
 Stanley Weston, American inventor and licensing agent (d. 2017)
 Dan Flavin, American artist (d. 1996)
 April 3  
 Renae Youngberg, American professional baseball player (d. 2015)
 Bob Dornan, American politician
 April 5
 Larry Felser, American sports columnist (d. 2013)
 Frank Gorshin, American actor (Batman) (d. 2005)
 April 7 – Wayne Rogers, American actor (M*A*S*H) (d. 2015)
 April 11 – Med Park, American basketball player (d. 1998)
 April 12 – Ben Nighthorse Campbell, American politician
 April 14 – Morton Subotnick, American electronic composer
 April 15
 Roy Clark, American country singer, musician, TV host (Hee Haw) (d. 2018)
 Elizabeth Montgomery, American actress (d. 1995)
 April 17 – Ron W. Miller, American president and CEO (The Walt Disney Company) (d. 2019)
 April 19 – Jayne Mansfield, American actress (d. 1967)
 April 21 – Chuck Mencel, American basketball player 
 April 24
 Patricia Bosworth, American actress, journalist and author
 Freddie Scott, American singer-songwriter (d. 2007)
 April 25
 Jerry Leiber, American popular music composer (d. 2011)
 Joyce Ricketts, American baseball player (AAGPBL) (d. 1992)
 Lawrence F. Scalise, American politician, attorney (d. 2015)
 April 26 – Carol Burnett, American actress, singer and comedian
 April 27 – Calvin Newborn, American jazz guitarist (d. 2018)
 April 30
 Ed Charles, American basketball player (d. 2018)
 Rod McKuen, American singer, songwriter and poet (d. 2015)
 Willie Nelson, American singer, songwriter, musician, actor, producer, author, poet and activist

May

 May 3
 James Brown, African-American soul musician (d. 2006)
 Steven Weinberg, American physicist, Nobel Prize laureate (d. 2021)
 May 7
 Roger Perry, American actor (d. 2018)
 Johnny Unitas, American football player (d. 2002)
 May 11
 Louis Farrakhan, African-American Muslim leader
 Anna Marguerite McCann, first female American underwater archaeologist (d. 2017)
 May 15 – Carol Habben, American baseball player (d. 1997)
 May 17 – Stefan Kanfer, American journalist, critic, editor and author (d. 2018)
 May 18 – Jack Stephens, American basketball player (d. 2011)
 May 20 – Dan Budnik, American photographer 
 May 26 – Edward Whittemore, American writer, CIA agent (d. 1995)

June

 June 1 – Charlie Wilson, American naval officer and politician (d. 2010)
 June 2 – Jerry Lumpe, American baseball player and coach (d. 2014)
 June 6 – Eli Broad, American entrepreneur and philanthropist (d. 2021)
 June 7
 Herb Score, American baseball player and sportscaster (d. 2008)
 Beverly Wills, American actress (d. 1963)
 June 8
 Rommie Loudd, American football player and coach (d. 1998)
 Jim Palmer, American basketball player (d. 2013)
 Joan Rivers, American comedian, actress and television host (d. 2014)
 June 9 – Don Young, American politician (d. 2022)
 June 10 – F. Lee Bailey, American criminal defense attorney (d. 2021)
 June 11 – Gene Wilder, American actor (d. 2016)
 June 12 – Eddie Adams, American photographer and photojournalist (d. 2004)
 June 17
 Bob Armstrong, American basketball player (d. 2016)
 Harry Browne, American writer, presidential candidate (d. 2006)
 Maurice Stokes, American basketball player (d. 1970)
 June 20
 Danny Aiello, American actor (d. 2019)
 Lazy Lester, American musician (d. 2018)
 June 21 – Bernie Kopell, American actor, comedian 
 June 22 – Dianne Feinstein, American politician
 June 23 – Dave Bristol, American baseball manager
 June 24 – Sam Jones, American professional basketball player (d. 2021)
 June 25 – James Meredith, African-American civil rights activist, writer, political adviser and Air Force veteran
 June 26 
 Ralph Guglielmi, American football quarterback (d. 2017)
 McNeil Moore, American football player
 Alan Trask, politician (d. 2019)
 June 27
 Louise Bishop, politician
 Gary Crosby, actor, singer (d. 1995)
 L. James Sullivan, firearms inventor
 June 28 – Morris Hirsch, mathematician
 June 29
 John Bradshaw, theologian, educator (d. 2016)
 Bob Fass, radio personality (d. 2021)
 Roy Harris, heavyweight boxer
 John D. Hawke, Jr., politician  (d. 2022)
 David Nething, politician

July

 July 1 – Frank Baumann, American Major League Baseball pitcher
 July 4 – Miriam Stevenson, American television host, actress, and former model and beauty pageant winner
 July 5 
 Jonathan Baumbach, American author, academic and film critic (d. 2019)
 Lisa Janti, American actress
 July 6 
 Al Ferrari, American basketball player (d. 2016)
 June Kenney, American actress (d. 2021)
 July 7 
 David McCullough, historian and author (d. 2022)
 Richard Ravitch, politician and businessman 
 July 8 
 Bucky Bockhorn, American basketball player
 Al Spangler, American baseball player
 July 9 – Ray Rippelmeyer, American baseball player and coach (d. 2022)
 July 10 – Richard G. Hatcher, first African-American politician (d. 2019)
 July 11 – Bob McGrath, American actor (Sesame Street)
 July 14 – Michael Cardenas, American businessman
 July 16 – Julian A. Brodsky, American businessman
 July 18 – Syd Mead, American industrial, conceptual designer (d. 2019)
 July 20 – Buddy Knox, American singer (d. 1999)
 July 21 – John Gardner, American novelist (d. 1982)
 July 22 – Bertice Reading, African-American actress, singer (d. 1991)
 July 23 – Bert Convy, American game show host, actor and singer (d. 1991)
 July 24
 John Aniston, American actor
 Doug Sanders, American golfer
 July 25 
 Ed Fleming, American basketball player (d. 2002)
 Ken Swofford, American actor (d. 2018)
 July 26 – Kathryn Hays, American television, soap opera actress ***
 July 27 – Nick Reynolds, American folk singer (d. 2008)
 July 29
 Lou Albano, American professional wrestler, actor (d. 2009)
 Robert Fuller, American actor and rancher 
 July 30 – Edd Byrnes, American actor, singer (77 Sunset Strip) (d. 2020)

August

 August 1
 Dom DeLuise, American actor, comedian (d. 2009)
 Jack Patera, American football player, coach (d. 2018)
 August 3 – Vera Katz, American politician (d. 2017)
 August 7
 Elinor Ostrom, American economist, academic and Nobel Prize laureate (d. 2012)
 Jerry Pournelle, American science fiction writer (d. 2017)
 August 8  – Carmine Persico, American mobster and convicted racketeer (d. 2019)
 August 10
 Doyle Brunson, American poker player
 Rocky Colavito, American baseball player
 August 11 – Jerry Falwell Sr., American pastor, televangelist and activist (Moral Majority) (d. 2007)
 August 16
 Julie Newmar, American actress, dancer and singer
 Stuart Roosa, American astronaut (d. 1994)
 August 17 – Gene Kranz, American NASA Flight Director
 August 18 – Frank Salemme, American gangster and hitman (d. 2022)
 August 19 – Bettina Cirone, American photographer, model 
 August 20
 Sihugo Green, American basketball player (d. 1980)
 George J. Mitchell, American politician
 August 21 – Jules Wright, American businessman and politician from Alaska (d. 2022)
 August 23
 Robert Curl, chemist, Nobel Prize laureate (d. 2022)
 Pete Wilson, politician
 August 24 – Ham Richardson, tennis player (d. 2006)
 August 25 
 Wayne Shorter, jazz saxophonist (d. 2023)
 Tom Skerritt, actor
 August 26 – Robert Chartoff, film producer (d. 2015)
 August 28 – Jean Weaver, baseball player (d. 2008)
 August 29 – Dickie Hemric, basketball player (d. 2017) 
 August 30 – Walter LaFeber, historian (d. 2021)

September

 September 1 
 Leonard A. Cole, political scientist (d. 2022)
 Conway Twitty, country music artist (d. 1993)
 September 2 – Ed Conlin, basketball player (d. 2012)
 September 3 – Tompall Glaser, singer (d. 2013)
 September 9 – Michael Novak, philosopher, author (d. 2017)
 September 11 – William Luther Pierce, author, activist (d. 2002)
 September 12 – Phil Jordon, basketball player (d. 1965)
 September 13 – Eileen Fulton, stage, soap opera actress
 September 15 – Henry Darrow, Puerto-Rican American actor (d. 2021) 
 September 17
 Chuck Grassley, politician
 Evelyn Kawamoto, competition swimmer (d. 2017)
 September 18
 Bob Bennett, politician (d. 2016)
 Robert Blake, actor (d. 2023)
 September 21 – Dick Simon, racing driver
 September 24 – Mel Taylor, drummer (The Ventures) (d. 1996)
 September 25 – Hubie Brown, basketball coach and broadcaster
 September 26 – Charlotte Mailliard Shultz, philanthropist and socialite(d. 2021)
 September 27
 Greg Morris, African-American actor (Mission: Impossible) (d. 1996)
 Kathleen Nolan, American actress, first female president of the Screen Actors Guild
 Will Sampson, American actor (d. 1987)
 September 30 – Cissy Houston, African-American singer

October

 October 5 – Billy Lee Riley, American rockabilly musician (d. 2009)
 October 9 
 Joan Berger, American female professional baseball player (d. 2021)
 Melvin Sokolsky, American fashion photographer (d. 2022)
 October 10 
 Carl Kabat, American Catholic priest and anti-nuclear activist (d. 2022)
 Jay Sebring, American hair stylist (d. 1969)
 October 11 – Thomas Atcitty, American politician (d. 2020)
 October 12 – Clayton Jacobson II, American inventor of the Jet Ski
 October 17 – William Anders, American astronaut
 October 21 – Rich Eichhorst, American basketball player 
 October 23 – Lois Youngen, American professional baseball player
 October 24 – Norman Rush, American writer
 October 27 – Theodosius (Lazor), primate (bishop) of the Orthodox Church in America (d. 2020)
 October 30 – Warith Deen Mohammed, American Muslim leader, theologian, philosopher and revivalist (d. 2008)

November

 November 3
 Ken Berry, American actor, dancer and singer (d. 2018)
 Aneta Corsaut, American actress (d. 1995)
 Michael Dukakis, American politician
 November 7 – Jackie Joseph, American actress
 November 9 
 Jim Perry, American game show host (d. 2015)
 Ed Corney, American bodybuilder (d. 2019)
 November 10
 Ronald Evans, American astronaut (d. 1990)
 Mack Rice, American singer and songwriter (d. 2016)
 November 11 – Kay Arthur, American Bible teacher, speaker and author
 November 14 – Fred Haise, American astronaut
 November 15 – Jack Burns, American comic performer (d. 2020)
 November 19 – Larry King, American television and radio host (d. 2021)
 November 21 – Jean Shepard, American country singer, songwriter (d. 2016)
 November 24 – Marie Wilcox, native America, last speaker of Wukchumni (d. 2021)
 November 25 – Kathryn Crosby, American actress
 November 26
 Jay Barbree, American space travel journalist (d. 2021)
 Robert Goulet, American entertainer (d. 2007)
 Tony Verna, American inventor of instant replay (d. 2015)
 November 28
 Hope Lange, American actress (d. 2003)
 Joe Knollenberg, American politician (d. 2018)
 November 29 – James Rosenquist, American painter (d. 2017)
 November 30 – Sam Gilliam, American artist (d. 2022).

December

 December 1 – Lou Rawls, African-American singer (d. 2006)
 December 2
 P. J. Cowan, American author
 Mike Larrabee, American athlete (d. 2003)
 December 4
 Wink Martindale, American game show host, disc jockey
 Dick Ricketts, American basketball player (d. 1988)
 Ronnie Shavlik, American basketball player (d. 1983)
 December 6 – Boris Nachamkin, American basketball player (d. 2018)
 December 8 – Johnny Green, American basketball player
 December 9 – Orville Moody, American golfer (d. 2008)
 December 11 – Charlie Bryan, American labor leader (d. 2013)
 December 13 – Lou Adler, American film and record producer
 December 15 – Tim Conway, American actor and comedian (d. 2019)
 December 16 – Billy Kinard, American football player and coach (d. 2018)
 December 17 
 Shirley Abrahamson, American jurist, Chief Justice of the Wisconsin Supreme Court (d. 2020)
 Walter Booker, American jazz bassist (d. 2006)
 December 18 – Lonnie Brooks, American blues singer and guitarist (d. 2017)
 December 20
 Brad Dye, American politician (d. 2018) 
 Jean Carnahan, American politician
 December 26 – Caroll Spinney, American puppeteer, cartoonist, author and speaker (d. 2019)
 December 28 – John Y. Brown Jr., American politician and businessman (d. 2022) 
 December 30 – Jean Carnahan, American politician

Deaths
 January 3 – Jack Pickford, film actor (The Little Shepherd of Kingdom Come), dies in France (born 1896 in Canada)
 January 5 – Calvin Coolidge, 30th President of the United States from 1923 to 1929, 29th Vice President of the United States from 1921 to 1923 (born 1872)
 January 9 – Kate Gleason, engineer (born 1865)
 January 17 – Louis Comfort Tiffany, stained glass artist, jewelry designer, son of Charles Lewis Tiffany (born 1848)
 January 25 – Lewis J. Selznick, film producer (born 1870)
 January 29 – Sara Teasdale, lyrical poet, suicide (born 1884)
 February 5 – James Banning, aviation pioneer (born 1900)
 February 18 – James J. Corbett, heavyweight boxer (born 1866)
 February 26 – Spottiswoode Aitken, silent film actor and Hollywood property developer (born 1868 in Scotland)
 February 27 – Walter Hiers, silent actor (born 1893)
 February 28 – Lilla Cabot Perry, Impressionist painter (born 1848)
 March 6 – Anton Cermak, Mayor of Chicago, fatally wounded in assassination attempt (born 1873)
 March 14 – Balto, sled dog (born 1919)
 March 30 – Giuseppe Zangara, attempted assassin of president-elect Franklin D. Roosevelt, killer of Mayor Anton Cermak of Chicago, executed (born 1900)
 April 4 – William A. Moffett, admiral, in crash of airship ) (born 18869)
 April 5 – Earl Derr Biggers, detective novelist and playwright, heart attack (born 1884)
 April 13 – Adelbert Ames, Governor of Mississippi from 1868 to 1870 and from 1874 to 1876 and U.S. Senator from Mississippi from 1870 to 1874 (born 1835)
 April 16 – Henry van Dyke Jr., poet, author, educator and clergyman (born 1852)
 April 20 – William Henry Holmes, anthropologist, archaeologist, geologist and museum director (born 1846)
 April 23 – Tim Keefe, baseball player (born 1857)
 May 19 – Thomas J. O'Brien, Michigan politician, diplomat (born 1842)
 May 25 – James E. Kelly, sculptor and illustrator (born 1855)
 May 26 – Jimmie Rodgers, country singer (born 1897)
 June 2 – Frank Jarvis, Olympic sprinter (born 1878)
 June 21 - Halbert Benton Cole, Georgetown University Law School Alumni, American Attorney in Black River Falls, Wi and Hamilton, Montana (b. 1879)
 June 29 – Roscoe "Fatty" Arbuckle, film actor, comedian, director and screenwriter (born 1887)
 July 2 – Caroline Yale, educator (born 1848)
 July 11 – Edward Dillon, silent film actor and director (born 1879)
 July 15
 Irving Babbitt, literary critic (born 1865)
 Freddie Keppard, jazz cornetist (born 1890)
 August 5 – Charles Harold Davis, landscape painter (born 1856)
 August 23 – Marie Cahill, singer and actress (born 1870)
 September 25 – Ring Lardner, satirical fiction and sports writer (born 1885)
 September 27 – Zaida Ben-Yusuf, portrait photographer (born 1869)
 October – Joan Winters, Broadway dancer, murdered in Jerusalem (born 1909)
 October 23 – Orville Harrold, operatic tenor (born 1878)
 October 29 – George Luks, realist painter (born 1867)
 November 4 – John Jay Chapman, essayist, poet, author and lawyer (born 1862)
 November 5 – Texas Guinan, actress, producer and entrepreneur (born 1884)
 November 12 – F. Holland Day, photographer and publisher (born 1864)
 November 21 – Inez Clough, African American singer, dancer and actress (born 1873)
 November 28 – Minnie Earl Sears, librarian (born 1873)
 December 2 – Clarence Burton, silent film actor (born 1882)
 December 16 – Robert W. Chambers, fiction writer (born 1865)
 December 17 – Charles Spiro, inventor and an attorney (born 1850)
 December 21 – Tod Sloan, jockey (born 1874)

See also
 Causes of the Great Depression
 Great Contraction
 List of American films of 1933
 Timeline of United States history (1930–1949)

References

External links
 

 
1930s in the United States
United States
United States
Years of the 20th century in the United States